The Great Eastern Railway (GER) was a pre-grouping British railway company, whose main line linked London Liverpool Street to Norwich and which had other lines through East Anglia.  The company was grouped into the London and North Eastern Railway in 1923.

Formed in 1862 after the amalgamation of the Eastern Counties Railway and several other smaller railway companies the GER served Cambridge, Chelmsford, Colchester, Great Yarmouth, Ipswich, King's Lynn, Lowestoft, Norwich, Southend-on-Sea (opened by the GER in 1889), and East Anglian seaside resorts such as Hunstanton (whose prosperity was largely a result of the GER's line being built) and Cromer. It also served a suburban area, including Enfield, Chingford, Loughton and Ilford. This suburban network was, in the early 20th century, the busiest steam-hauled commuter system in the world.

The majority of the Great Eastern's locomotives and rolling stock were built at Stratford Works, part of which was on the site of today's Stratford International station and the rest was adjacent to Stratford Regional station. The GER owned  of line and had a near-monopoly in East Anglia until the opening of the Midland and Great Northern Joint Railway in 1893 although there were a number of minor lines, such as the Mid-Suffolk Light Railway that stayed resolutely independent until after the grouping in 1923.

History

Amalgamation
Between 1851 and 1854 the Eastern Counties Railway under the chairmanship of David Waddington had negotiated arrangements to work most of the other railways in East Anglia resulting in a network of lines totalling . Whilst Parliament favoured competition it was also aware that the ECR was constantly at war with its neighbours and whilst these working arrangements were approved there was a condition that a bill for full amalgamation was presented by 1861.

Waddington departed under a cloud in 1856 and was replaced by Horatio Love. By 1860 many shareholders were unhappy listing several grievances they saw as getting in the way of their dividend payments. These included continual conflict over working of other lines, suspicion and distrust of the joint committee, inadequate services to and from London, on-going litigation and law costs and a lack of progress on amalgamation.

By February 1862 the bill had its second reading and was then followed by a lengthy committee process where various parties petitioned against the bill. On 7 August 1862 the bill passed and the Great Eastern Railway was formed by the amalgamation of the Eastern Counties Railway and a number of smaller railways.

Early years (1862-1869)
Unsurprisingly the first GER board had a strong Eastern Counties flavour with Horatio Love in the chair and James Goodson the deputy chair. The board consisted of six former ECR directors with two Eastern Union Railway, two Norfolk Railway and one each from the Northern and Eastern Railway (still an independent body at this point) and East Anglian Railway.
 
Operational costs were high on the new railway and new sources of revenue needed quickly. Work at improving suburban services was put in hand and trains from London to Norwich speeded up to give businessmen and merchants more time to conduct their business. A new suburban line to Enfield Town via Seven Sisters was proposed as well as a new London terminus to replace an inadequate Bishopsgate. By August 1863 receipts were increasing and many of the pre-amalgamation disputes were being settled.

The GER and Great Northern Railway each submitted bills for a line from March to Spalding and although the GNR was successful the GER was awarded running rights over the new line which would later become part of the Great Northern and Great Eastern Joint Railway. Steamboat services were also seen as a new source of revenue with services running from Harwich to Rotterdam, Flushing and Antwerp.

A change of leadership also occurred with Horatio Love being replaced by James Goodson as chairman with Captain Henry Jervis-White-Jervis as his deputy. Love was considered too cautious and some on the board still resented his role prior to amalgamation at the ECR. Various directors were allocated specific responsibilities (generally running these through committees) leaving Goodson free to develop new schemes and represent the GER on lines where they had a financial interest.

Following an accident at North Wootton in early August 1863, where the deaths of five passengers was partially attributed to the poor state of the rolling stock, a large rolling stock order was placed.

By December 1863 the financial picture was looking better and in early 1864 the GER started looking a new railway to move coal from South Yorkshire to London via Spalding and the GN link from Spalding to March. The Great Eastern was clearly in an expansionist phase with further locomotives (forming the basis of standardisation over its disparate inherited fleet), carriages and wagons under construction. More ships were being ordered for Antwerp and Rotterdam traffic and proposals for 28 miles of new metropolitan lines and a new city terminus.

In March 1864, a joint committee of the House of Commons and House of Lords approved the East London Line which would link the North London, Great Eastern and London and Blackwall railways.  The parliamentary bill for the new freight line failed although other bills including the construction of a new London terminus were approved. Later that year the GER was in talks about expansion northwards with the Lancashire and Yorkshire Railway (L&YR) which lead to the deposition of a bill in early 1865.

The board meeting of February 1865 saw passenger receipts outstripping goods receipts. Fish traffic from Lowestoft and Great Yarmouth was growing and money was being spent on stations, replacing wooden bridges and upgrading the track. However, a number of shareholders voiced concern. The following month the House of Commons rejected the joint GER/L&YR bill forcing the GER to restart negotiations with the Great Northern Railway. The chairman of the parliamentary committee suggested to the board that the next bill should include a direct Spalding to Lincoln link.

Board unity was about to be shattered when a short paragraph in The Times reported serious differences of opinions existed between the directors. In August 1865 deputy chairman Jervis-White-Jervis issued an appeal raising concerns about the management of the railway. This prompted an internal investigation and in a board meeting at the end of the month, an absent Jervis-White-Jervis was replaced by William Shaw as deputy chairman. The internal investigation concluded that many of Jervis-White-Jervis's concerns were relevant including borrowing more money than authorised and the poor deal the GER got on leasing the London and Blackwell Railway. In a meeting in January the following year many of the directors were duly replaced (by members of the investigating committee) and at the following board meeting in February, Charles Turner was elected as the new chairman.

The new board, facing a financial crisis, had identified a number of issues including the provision of a new terminus station at Liverpool Street, Bishopsgate (the existing terminus) was to be converted to a goods terminal and a new coal depot to be built in Whitechapel. The financial environment was still proving difficult with losses on the London and Blackwell line and a cattle plague seriously affecting that traffic. By March the board was meeting most days in an effort to keep the railway running.

The financial crisis of 1866 saw loan interest rates rise to 10% on 12 May. On 8 June the board approached Parliament for the right to borrow more money and raise additional money through new shares to fund the expansion programme outlined above. This was confirmed on 4 July. By this time there was little money available for dividends and the company looked very carefully at their expansion programme and unprofitable branch lines. By December 1866 little interest was being shown in the new shares, so the board went unsuccessfully to the Bank of England and Union Bank for further loans. The GER did, however, manage to agree running rights via the Great Northern Railway as far as Wakefield and with the Manchester, Sheffield and Lincolnshire Railway to interchange traffic at Lincoln and Retford.

The crisis continued into 1867 and by March it was apparent that the preference share payments due in April could not be paid. The board also received a letter from the drivers seeking improved working conditions. Additionally The Times suggested the GER may be about to appoint a receiver. Early April saw daily negotiations with the Union Bank although agreement was reached with the drivers by the middle of that month.

May saw the company trying to raise further funds via a parliamentary bill. However, by 25 June the House of Lords had rejected the bill and the board took steps to protect the company's property from its creditors. Matters were hardly helped when deputy chairman Samuel Laing resigned to become the chairman of the London, Brighton & South Coast Railway on 1 July. On 2 July a suit was bought before vice-chancellor Sir Richard Malins and the GER was placed into chancery.

Regrouping after this, the board pursued Edward Watkin, an MP with many other railway interests, as chairman. He did advise that the board that it needed to reconstitute itself in order to rebuild confidence in order to acquire new capital.  Some existing members of the board were not pleased with this and it was not until 3 January 1868 that a reduced board of eleven members met with six new members including Watkin and Viscount Cranbourne MP who was elected as the new chairman.

The new directors were all allocated specific roles and a number of changes were made to reduce costs and improve profitability. Cranbourne also approached the London & North Western Railway to report on the state of the permanent way and rolling stock. By August 1868 the tide was turning with increased receipts and some debts being paid off. The GER had done a deal with the Midland Railway to route their coal traffic via their lines and a new coal depot at Whitechapel opened in December further improving profitability.

By August 1869 the financial position had improved enough to restore a dividend and this was whilst the Walthamstow line (now the Chingford branch line) was under construction.  In the same month, Deputy Chairman Charles Turner resigned due to suspected fraud which was to lead to his bankruptcy later in the year. Although proceedings were initiated no prosecution resulted.

1870-1879 A new London terminus
The original London terminus was opened at Shoreditch in east London by the Eastern Counties Railway (ECR) on 1 July 1840 when the railway was extended westwards from an earlier temporary terminus in Devonshire Street, near Mile End. The station was renamed Bishopsgate on 27 July 1847.

The Great Eastern attempted to obtain a West End terminus, alongside the one in east London, via the Tottenham and Hampstead Junction Railway, formed by an Act of Parliament of 28 July 1862. Plans to extend the western end of this line via a proposed 'London Main Trunk Railway', underneath Hampstead Road, the Metropolitan Railway (modern Circle line) and Tottenham Court Road, to Charing Cross, were rejected by Parliament in 1864.

A new London terminus at Liverpool Street was opened to traffic on 2 February 1874, and was completely operational from 1 November 1875. From this date the original terminus at Bishopsgate closed to passengers, although it reopened as a goods station in 1881.

1900-1914
In 1902 the Northern and Eastern Railway was finally absorbed by the GER, although it had been worked by the Eastern Counties Railway under a 999-year lease taken on 1 January 1844 whereby the Eastern Counties Railway would work the Northern and Eastern Railway in return for an annual rent and division of the profits.

Despite several half-hearted attempts by the GER during the latter part of the nineteenth century, it was the Midland Railway (MR) that finally bought the London, Tilbury and Southend Railway (LT&SR) in 1912 with the MR offering a better deal for the LT&SR shareholders than the GER ever had. The agreement was ratified by the LT&SR shareholders on 26 June 1911. During the following parliamentary session, the official parliamentary bill allowing the takeover by the MR was passed on 7 August 1912 although it was legally backdated to 1 January 1912. At the time of the sale the LT&SR was one of the most prosperous railways in the UK but too small to fund the changes it needed to make.

In 1914 the GER became the first UK railway company to employ a general manager from overseas, Henry Worth Thornton. He had previously worked as the General Superintendent of the Long Island Railroad in the USA.

During the First World War 1914-1918
The Railway Executive Committee was set up in 1912 after an incident between France and Germany in the Moroccan Port of Agadir and would take directions from the military and liaise with the railway companies. As it adjoined the North Sea the GER undertook a significant role in the war.
 
Had there been an invasion then the railways had evacuation plans for the civilian populations. The GER did require some upgrading to deal with the increased levels of traffic – lines were doubled, additional passing loops provided, platforms extended and watering facilities improved (for both the iron and more conventional horses). A number of link lines were provided including the link between the Tottenham and Hampstead at Gospel Oak to the Midland Railway and between the T&H and Great Northern Railway at Crouch Hill, Both links remain part of the national network .

When the war started several jobs fell to the railway – reserve troops and naval personnel had to be returned to their units and this saw an upsurge in usage of normal services. Various units were moved to the coast for defensive purposes and at the same time the government had started buying horses throughout the area leading to additional trains.  There were also then the units that were being moved to the front line. The Royal Navy was using coal as its primary source of propulsion and additional coal trains would have been operated through the area as well.

In August 1914 the Germans disguised a passenger steamer (the ) in GER colours and deployed it as a minelayer.

The GER employed significant numbers of women during this period as many men had joined the army.

By 1916 unnecessary travel was being discouraged to conserve coal supplies.

The company set up a section dedicated to the movement of military traffic and between 1914 and 1918 nearly 10.5 million men were moved on GER services as well as significant numbers of horses and supplies. Specific military traffic was generated at Brimsdown, Ponders End and Stowmarket. Because of attacks on east coast shipping, traffic previously moved by sea was also carried on the GER (and more specifically the Great Eastern and Great Northern Joint Railway).

The GER also suffered from a number of Zeppelin attacks with, amongst others, the dormitory at Stratford engine shed and the royal shelter at King's Lynn both being hit.

After the First World War (1918-1923)

In 1922, a large marble memorial was installed at Liverpool Street station commemorating GER staff who had answered the call of duty to fight but died in action in the First World War. The memorial was unveiled by Sir Henry Wilson, who was assassinated by two Irish Republican Army gunmen on his way home from the unveiling ceremony. A smaller memorial to Wilson was later placed adjacent to the GER memorial, alongside one to Charles Fryatt, a British mariner who was executed by the Germans for attempting to ram a U-boat in 1915.

The Great Eastern name has survived, being used both for the Great Eastern Main Line route between London and Norwich, and also for the First Great Eastern train operating company which served much of the old GER route between 1997 and 2004.

Constituent companies
The Great Eastern Railway was made up of a number of constituent companies when it was formed in 1862. The most notable was the Eastern Counties Railway, which had taken over most of the main companies by this time. After 1862 there were still a number of companies operating independently in East Anglia, but most of these were eventually taken over by Great Eastern, although some such as the Mid-Suffolk Light Railway survived until 1923.
The history and exact status of many of these railways is quite complex. In many cases the operation of the railway that built the line was taken over (usually by the Eastern Counties Railway before 1862 and the Great Eastern Railway after that date) although the original railway company often existed in legal form after that date.

The 1862 Act stated that the purpose of the legislation was "to amalgamate the Eastern Counties, the East Anglian, the Newmarket, the Eastern Union and the Norfolk railway companies, and for other purposes". This suggests that despite the fact that some of these railway companies had been taken over by the Eastern Counties Railway prior to the 1862 Act, they still legally existed.
 
 BTR (Bury St Edmunds and Thetford Railway) – became part of the GER in 1878.
 EAR (East Anglian Railway) – taken over by ECR in 1852 but existed until the 1862 Act
 ECR (Eastern Counties Railway) – was the principal constituent of the GER in the 1862 Act
 EHSR - Ely, Haddenham and Sutton Railway - although independent, the GER had a third share of its capital.  The GER also provided staff, locomotives and rolling stock in return for 50% of the gross takings. Changed name to ESIR in 1878
 ESIR - Ely and St Ives Railway - taken over by GER in 1898
 E&NR - Ely and Newmarket Railway - built Ely to Newmarket line. Formed in 1875 and taken over by GER in 1898.
 ENR - East Norfolk Railway - built many lines in East Norfolk - later vested into the GER
 ESR - East Suffolk Railway - taken over by ECR in 1859
 EUR - Eastern Union Railway - taken over by ECR in 1854 but existed until the 1862 Act.
 FR -   Felixstowe Railway - line operated by GE from 1878 and taken over fully in 1885
 IBR - Ipswich and Bury Railway - amalgamated with EUR in 1847
 LBR - London and Blackwall Railway - leased by the GER in 1866, but remained independent until the 1923 Grouping.
 LDR - Lynn and Dereham Railway - amalgamated with LER to form EAR in 1847
 LER - Lynn and Ely Railway - amalgamated with LDR to form EAR in 1847
 LHR - Lynn and Hunstanton Railway
 LID - London and India Dock Railway Company - lines operated by GER from opening
 LRH - Lowestoft Railway and Harbour Co - leased line to NR in 1847
 N&ER - Northern and Eastern Railway - leased by the ECR in 1844, the N&ER lasted as a legal entity until 1902.
 NEW - Newmarket Railway - purchased by the ECR in 1854 but existed until the 1862 Act
 NR -   Norfolk Railway - formed when the N&BR and Y&NR merged in 1845 - worked by ECR from 1848 existed until the 1862 Act
 N&BR - Norwich & Brandon Railway - merged with Y&NR in 1845 to become the Norfolk Railway
 RSJR - Ramsey and Somersham Junction Railway - became part of the GNGEJR in 1897
 STJR - Stratford and Thames Junction Railway -  part of the ECR
 SAWR - Saffron Walden Railway - purchased by the GER in 1877
 SVR - Stour Valley Railway - taken over by EUR in 1848
 TEN - Tendring Hundred Railway - vested into the GER 1883
 THJR - Tottenham and Hampstead Junction Railway
 TSR - Thetford and Swaffham Railway
 WHBR - Ware, Hadham and Buntingford Railway - merged with GER in 1868
 WFR - Wells & Fakenham Railway
 WVR - Waveney Valley Railway - taken over by GER in 1863
 Y&NR - Yarmouth & Norwich Railway - amalgamated with Norwich & Brandon Railway into the Norfolk Railway 1845

Joint railways
 The East London Railway was created by the East London Railway Company, a consortium of six railway companies: the GER, the London, Brighton and South Coast Railway (LB&SCR), the London, Chatham and Dover Railway (LCDR), the South Eastern Railway (SER), the Metropolitan Railway, and the District Railway. The latter two operated what are now the Metropolitan, Circle, District and Hammersmith & City lines of the London Underground. The GER had two seats on the management committee which met twice per year and the GER members were supported by the company secretary and a solicitor.
 GNGEJR Great Northern and Great Eastern Joint Railway - a joint railway committee formed in 1879. It consisted of five directors from each company, met every quarter and the GER members were supported by the Secretary, a solicitor, an engineer and the General Manager. 
 NSJR - Norfolk and Suffolk Joint Railway Committee - a joint committee formed with the Midland and Great Northern Railway
 T&HR - Tottenham and Hampstead Joint Railway - run in conjunction with the Midland Railway.

Geographical development
The table below shows the building dates of the railways that made up the Great Eastern and the companies that built them. Abbreviations from above list.

Other railways
 NLR - North London Railway
 GNR - Great Northern Railway
Notes
 A - worked by NLR until 1866, then by GER one year and NLR the next until 1874 then GER and successors. Known locally as "the Stratford Jack"
 B - an attempt by the GER to gain a terminus in the West End - Parliament terminated the line at Highgate Road, thus thwarting GE ambitions. The line, however went on to have a future with the Midland Railway - see Tottenham and Hampstead Junction Railway for further details - and for a few years some Great Eastern Cambridge line services were routed to St Pancras.
 C - Operated by the GER from opening.

Infrastructure

Stations

Engine sheds
The Great Eastern had one of the largest engine sheds in the country at Stratford which in January 1923 had an allocation of 555 locomotives. At the other end of the scale, small engine sheds at the end of country branch lines had perhaps one or two locomotives in their charge. At this time the locomotives were generally allocated to the major shed in the area and the smaller sheds had no actual allocation.

Before 1914 the engine sheds were organised into districts, with sheds at: Stratford; Ipswich; Norwich; Cambridge; Peterborough; King's Lynn; and Doncaster. In 1914 this was reduced to five with King's Lynn and Doncaster being abolished. By 1915 they were organised onto four districts (primary sheds in parenthesis): Southern (Stratford); Eastern (Ipswich); Northern (Norwich); and Western (Cambridge/Peterborough).

The Great Eastern did not see the maintenance of engine sheds as one of its top priorities. Many original structures it inherited from constituent railways struggled on in various states of disrepair, not only through Great Eastern days, but through its successor company London & North Eastern Railway from 1923 until 1947 and indeed to the end of steam on the Great Eastern in 1959.

Coaling at engine sheds was generally done by hand with the coaling stages constructed of wood. At a busy engine shed such as Stratford, each individual coaler employed on the coaling stage was expected to empty the contents of a  coal truck during his shift.

Turntables were generally small – in 1900 the longest was  – enough to turn the later B12 Class 4-6-0 locomotive. By 1932, with the advent of bigger locomotives and the working of other companies' locomotives onto GE territory, turntables had grown, with the major sheds generally having  turntables.

In 1922 the GER locomotive allocation across its sheds was: Cambridge - 178; Colchester - 47; Doncaster - 5; Ipswich - 131; King's Lynn - 37; Lincoln (Pyewipe Junction) - 12; Lowestoft - 22; March - 97; Norwich - 119; Parkeston - 20; Peterborough East - 86; Stratford - 555; Wisbech - 7; and Yarmouth - 20. Each main shed had a number of sub-sheds and locomotives would work from these sheds for significant periods. For instance it is estimated that some 150 engines were outbased from Stratford at any one time.

Works

The main workshops were located at Stratford Works and was responsible for the building of locomotives and carriages. Wagons were initially built here as well but as the railway grew a new wagon works was built at Temple Mills in 1896.

In 1894 a carriage painting facility was opened at Felixstowe Beach station which dealt with the painting of around 200 carriages each year.

Many engine sheds carried out heavier repairs. Ipswich engine shed for instance had a tube shop and a smithy containing eight forges and a steamhammer.

Another wagon works was located at Ipswich (adjacent to the engine shed south of the tunnel).

Stratford Works and Ipswich lasted until the 1990s but Temple Mills closed in 1983.

Signal boxes
The GER always allowed contractors a certain amount of freedom within their specified design, and three early types evolved built by Saxby & Farmer, Stevens or McKenzie & Holland. By 1877 the GER were consolidating their own design, which featured a gabled roof, with large overhang, and weatherboarding. Windows were always two panes high in this design. A more ornate style of construction replaced this type in 1882, but this did not last long - the GER was never a rich railway. By 1883 brick boxes were being built to a plainer design, although 1884 saw some ornateness returning. For instance, March West box contained mock stonework in the gables, fancy window design and decorated bargeboards.

By 1886 timber boxes were being constructed again as well as brick examples but this - with some variation - was the last design for Great Eastern signal boxes.

By 1997 there were still 90 of these in service, but with recent (2012) changes, and more changes expected. 
, then it is unlikely that many will remain in service for much longer.

Operations and timetables

Main line
Over the years the principal main line services between Norwich and Liverpool Street were routed via Ipswich or Cambridge, generally depending on the quickest journey time available. Before the GER was formed its predecessor the Eastern Counties Railway had a reputation for speed second only to the Great Western and Great Northern Railways. There is some doubt as to the reliability of these times; as the writer Thackeray observed in The Lamentable Ballad of the Foundling of Shoreditch, "For even the Heastern Counties' trains must come in at last."

In the early days of the GER the 5 p.m. departure from Shoreditch (the terminus before Liverpool Street) took 52 minutes to reach Bishop's Stortford (average speed ) and 92 to get to Cambridge.

Because the route via Colchester had been built by a number of different companies, mostly in dubious states of financial stability, it was some years before the Colchester route rose to prominence. Then, as line speeds on this or the Cambridge line improved, the focus of the Norwich services would shift from one to another. On taking over the entire route in 1862, the GER improved speeds on the Colchester line so that Colchester was reached in 70 minutes (non-stop) and Yarmouth (via the East Suffolk route) could be reached in 3 hours 25 minutes. Norwich was 3 hours and 15 minutes via Ipswich and 4 hours via Cambridge.

In 1869 the situation had been reversed and it was quicker to get to Norwich via Cambridge (3 hours 30 minutes) compared to 4 hours 15 minutes via Ipswich. In 1870/1 the balance shifted back to the Ipswich route, with a time of 3 hours 35 minutes compared to 3 hours 53 minutes via Cambridge. By 1878 the Cambridge route was ascendant, with times of 3 hours 12 minutes for the fastest trains compared to a time of 4 hours 10 minutes via Ipswich. In the 1880s both routes had similar times, but by 1887 the Ipswich route offered a time of 2 hours 40 minutes which improved to 2 hours 31 minutes in 1897 and by a further five minutes in 1906.

Main line boat trains
Boat trains commenced running to Harwich Parkeston Quay in 1882 and were timed at 1 hour 45 minutes from Liverpool Street. By 1895 this was down to 1 hour 30 minutes. In 1897 the 8:30 pm train was run as two separate trains - 8:30 pm for the Hook of Holland and 8:35 pm for Antwerp. With the introduction of the corridor restaurant cars in 1904, the time was eased to 87 minutes, but the introduction of the Class 1500 4-6-0 express engines in 1912 saw a running time of 82 minutes.

Suburban services (the Jazz)

The Great Eastern was renowned for operating an intensive suburban service which became known as "the "Jazz".

Serving the East End of London, the London Docklands and the capital's eastern suburbs, the Great Eastern's suburban services had a much greater proportion of working class industrial workers, labourers and lower-ranking office workers than the suburban networks of the likes of the London and South Western Railway or the Metropolitan. The GER had to transport greater numbers of passengers commuting in and out of the urban centre and at lower fares. The GER encouraged passenger numbers with low-price 'workman fares' services which ran in the early morning and late evening. These used older rolling stock with high-density seating (often using wooden benches for ease of cleaning after being used by passengers from docks, factories and markets in dirty work clothes). There were also 'half fare trains' using more modern and comfortable suburban coaching stock aimed at lower-income white-collar workers such as clerks and junior office workers. There was a symbiotic relationship between the railway and property development - the existence of the railway made it possible for even industrial workers to move into new housing developments in the suburbs which then provided extra custom for the GER. The GER itself invested in property development near its routes and in some cases even built its own housing on land purchased as part of railway construction. Although most closely associated with these crowded, low-cost commuter train serving the suburbs of eastern London, the GER also provided luxurious first class compartments in many of its commuter trains for businessmen and wealthier customers travelling to and from The City with its numerous banks and other financial offices.

By 1900 over 90 per cent of passengers using Liverpool Street station were making journeys of 12 miles (19 km) or less and around 75,000 people arrived at the station before 10.30am each morning. A total of 400 suburban and 36 main line trains were timetabled to use the terminus each day. Passenger numbers continued to rise in the early 20th century and a survey in 1913 showed that some of the GER's suburban trains were carrying up to 1400 people each and the station itself was beginning to suffer from overcrowding at peak times that was not only preventing the easy movement of people in and out and delaying the departure of trains but presenting a danger to the public.

After World War I (during which a decline in passenger numbers provided something of a reprieve) the GER began to consider ways of alleviating the problem. The Liverpool Street site and its approaches were already full utilised, with no room for additional or extended platforms, more tracks or an enlarged station concours. Consideration was given to electrification, following the model of the London, Brighton and South Coast Railway which had electrified its inner suburban routes between 1909 and 1912 and so been able to run both more and faster services on existing infrastructure. However the high capital costs required of electrifying the GER's much more extensive and wider-reaching suburban network - estimated at £3 million (£140 million in 2021) - were beyond the perennially cash-strapped GER's resources. Before the war the GER had recruited the American executive Henry Worth Thornton - former superintendent of the  Long Island Rail Road (in many ways an American counterpart to the GER, operating an intensive commuter service in and out of New York City) - as its general manager. Working with operations superintendent F.V. Russell (former chief designer at Stratford Works), Thornton developed a way of comprehensively overhauling and optimising the Great Eastern's suburban service to increase capacity on the existing infrastructure with minimal investment.

At Liverpool street tracks were rearranged and new junctions between running lines added to improve capacity and flexibility. Small refuge tracks were added at the platform ends to stable locomotives between duties without blocking running lines, signalling was expanded to allow more than one train to occupy a platform road at a time and on the station concourse the passenger barriers were moved back to both direct outward-going passengers more effectively to their trains and to encourage outward-going passengers to leave the station without getting in the way of other streams of people leaving or joining other trains.

Improvements to the rolling stock were made on services running to Chingford. Enfield and Wood Green (Palace Gates). Trains were reformed into sets of 16 four-wheel coaches with each train having seating capacity for 848 people, with additional standing room in peak hours. These were non-corridor compartment-type coaches, but in for third class the compartment dividing walls were cut down to the level of the tops of the seats, allowing more nimble passengers to climb over the seat backs between seating bays to find empty seats. This meant that passengers no longer had to find a compartment with vacant seats before boarding which reduced the dwell time - Thornton and Russell aimed to get the time spent at intermediate stops down from minutes to seconds. To help with this the coaches had their doors painted in different colours to identify the class of each compartment - first class were painted yellow and second class for blue, with the third class accommodation which made up the majority of all the GER's trains being unmarked. Similarly, a system of coloured boards representing the destination and/or route of each train was introduced, with the boards being fitted to the rear and sides of the guard's van which would be nearest the concourse at Liverpool Street and enable passengers to quickly find and board their train.

The GER had already adopted the Westinghouse air brake due to its greater effectiveness and quicker response when making frequent stops in suburban services. Thornton and Russell instructed drivers to adopt a new technique of running into stations at speed, fully applying the brake as the engine reached the start of the platform, then fully releasing the brake as it approached the end, which would bring the train to a rapid but smooth stop with the engine right at the end of the platform. This would shave further crucial seconds of the time required for each intermediate stop when compared to the more usual technique of cutting speed on the approach to stations, making an initial part-application of the brake and easing the train to a stop. However with the new method there was very little room for error and drivers had to learn exactly when to apply the brake (and by exactly what amount) and when to release it in order to bring the train to a stop without under- or over-shooting the stopping point and without jolting the train and its passengers.

The new services were introduced in July 1920. When fully combined these improvements and alterations allowed 24 suburban trains to use Liverpool Street each hour - over 40,000 passengers when inward and outward flows were combined. This was a world record for a steam-hauled railway system. On arrival, the engine that had brought the train in would immediately be uncoupled, while another engine was attached at the other end - in many cases this engine would have followed the train into the platform through the station approaches, having been let out of a holding siding to run close behind by the new signalling arrangements. The detached engine would be topped up with water from a newly-installed water column at the concourse end of each platform road. As the train departed, the now-available engine would follow it down the platform before being sent either to one of the refuge bays in the platform ends or to a siding at the approaches to follow another arriving service into another platform in its turn. In most cases engines were not kept at Liverpool Street for more than ten minutes between duties. Each individual train was arranged to spend as little as four minutes at the terminus between arrival and departure. This intensity of service is all the more remarkable when it is considered that the vast majority of the suburban services were concentrated in only four of Liverpool Street's 18 platforms, with the remainder being used for outer suburban and mainline services.

In total, Thornton and Russell's new optimised service provided an increase in capacity of between 50 and 75 per cent without any major changes to infrastructure, no new rolling stock and a total cost of only £80,000 (£3.6 million in 2020 - only a fortieth of the projected cost of electrification). The new suburban services were popular with passengers and the press (which had frequently criticised the GER in the pre-WW1 years for overcrowding and slow journey times, even to the extent of running long-term campaigns against the company). The clashing bright colours of the painted doors and the identification boards were seen as a distinctive feature of the new services from the start and early GER publicity referred to 'The Rainbow Service'. However the appearance was thought of as 'jazzy' in the slang of the period and a local newspaper called the service The Jazz, which quickly became widely used.

The service was initially operated by the GER's existing stud of 2-4-2T engines such as the M15 and G69 while carriages were adapted versions of either existing four-wheelers or new-builds to these older designs. The GER had always intended to introduce more powerful engines and more modern and higher-capacity carriages to The Jazz to maximise the improvements. New 0-6-2 L77 Class tank engines were introduced from 1921, along with new eight-wheel 57 ft-long (17.3 metres) compartment coaches (with the added refinement of steam heating for winter use), which had their class identification colours painted in a strip between the windows and the roof rather than on the doors. By 1924 over 280,000 people were using The Jazz every day and Liverpool Street was regularly handling over 40,000 passengers per hour in peak periods. When the GER was grouped into the London and North Eastern Railway in 1923 the LNER began introducing articulated car sets of even higher capacity to a design developed by the Great Northern Railway.

The true Jazz services only lasted until 1926 when the service frequency and intensity was cut down due to the General Strike and rising competition from trams, trolley buses, motorbuses and private cars meant that the service on the former GER suburban lines was never brought back up to its planned level. None the less the services remained widely known as The Jazz and even in the 1940s was still running 18 trains per hour and between 160,000 and 180,000 passengers used Liverpool Street each day. Plans to electrify the former GER system had been developed in the 1930s and were put into action under British Railways. Liverpool Street received its first electric lines in 1946 and electric suburban services - finally replacing The Jazz - began in 1960.

The GER also operated suburban services out of Fenchurch Street station with trains to North Woolwich, Blackwall (until 1925) Gallions and Loughton sharing the station with the London Tilbury and Southend until 1912 when the Midland railway took over operation of that railway.

Named trains
The Cathedrals Express operated from Liverpool Street via Cambridge, Ely, Lincoln and Doncaster to York. Three services were run each day although it was never a particularly well patronised service.

The North Country Continental operated between Harwich and Manchester Piccadilly usually being routed via March and the GNGEJR route.
This train included the first restaurant car on the Great Eastern (in 1891) and this was also the first service in the UK to allow third-class passengers to dine. A new train set was built for this service in 1906 and generally operated in the following formation:

ENGINE+THIRD CLASS BRAKE+CORRIDOR THIRD+OPEN THIRD+KITCHEN AND OPEN FIRST+SEMI-OPEN FIRST+SIX WHEEL BRAKE (this constituted the York section). Then followed various corridor composite brakes followed each detached from the rear of the northbound train en route. These were for LIVERPOOL (detached Doncaster on the outward journey)+ LIVERPOOL + MANCHESTER(detached at Lincoln and routed via the Great Central routes) + BIRMINGHAM (via Midland Railway routes) + BIRMINGHAM (via London and North Western routes)(both of which were detached at March).

The Norfolk Coast Express operated between Cromer and Liverpool Street and a purpose-built train was built for this service in 1907. This was the first formation without six-wheeler carriages in the 12-car formation, which included eight carriages for Cromer, two for Sheringham and two for Mundesley. The portions were detached at North Walsham.

However whether all (or indeed any) of these trains carried nameboards in Great Eastern days is doubtful.

Branch line services
Typically branch line services were worked by small tank engines usually with ancient carriages handed down from main line or suburban services. Generally many branch services would be timed to connect to services to the main line thus providing through journeys. Many rural branch lines had no more than a handful of services each day.

For instance in the July 1922 Bradshaws Timetable Guide, Table 316 showed five departures from Framlingham at 07:20, 08:30, 12:40, 16:25 and 18:30. All services had connections to London Liverpool Street. All trains called at the two stations on the branch, taking 18 minutes to get to the junction station at Wickham Market.

From Wickham Market the trains departed at 07:56, 09:35, 13:14, 17:52 and 19:10. All services except the 09:35 departure had a connection from London Liverpool Street.

In 1865, when the Saffron Walden Railway opened, the GER provided some of its most modern rolling stock on opening day before reverting to stock of more dubious quality for general operation of the line.

Other services
The GER ran a number of trains from Ely and Cambridge to St Pancras after the Midland Railway completed the Tottenham and Hampstead Junction Railway in 1880. in 1914 there were three express services from St Pancras to Cambridge (12:22 pm 2:40 pm and 5:05 pm) with the 12:22 pm reaching Cambridge in a creditable 71 minutes. Suspended during the First World War, these were briefly revived but stopped running in 1922.

Royal trains were also worked from St Pancras to Sandringham in Norfolk, and race day trains to Newmarket also operated into St Pancras.

The GER also operated services from Liverpool Street via the East London Line to New Cross and New Cross Gate with some services being extended to East Croydon.

Freight traffic
As the GER served a predominantly rural area, the majority of outward traffic was agricultural in nature. The opening of the Great Northern and Great Eastern Joint railway in 1882 gave the GER access to the coal fields in South Yorkshire and East Nottinghamshire and this became an important source of traffic for the railway.

There were a number of ports on the GER including King's Lynn, Great Yarmouth, Lowestoft, Felixstowe and Parkeston Quay. Fish traffic emanated from Lowestoft and Great Yarmouth.

One of the more obscure services the GER offered was the delivery of sea water. This service started in the 1870s and by 1880 it was reported that  had been delivered on a single day. A redundant steam locomotive was employed in the task at Lowestoft and a number of fish and open carriage wagons were converted to saltwater tanks. The trains ran to London where the water was distilled into  barrels and sold for sixpence (pre decimalisation price c. 1880, about £ in ). The sea water was used in baths and was still running as late as 1910 although the exact final date of operation is unknown.

Accidents and incidents
 On 3 August 1863, a passenger train ran into a bullock near North Wootton station. Five passengers were killed as a result with the poor state of the rolling stock being partially to blame.
 On 26 September 1865, a light engine returning from Great Yarmouth to Ipswich derailed between Darsham and Halesworth killing the driver and fireman.
 On 3 September 1881, there was a collision at Bow Road where a train ran into the back of a stationary train which had failed at the station. The driver and fireman of the moving train were killed and 11 passengers injured. In the inquiry that followed the cause was deemed to be the failure of the signalman to protect the rear of the train by placing signals to danger. The train crew however were criticised in that while they had noticed the signals were not at danger, they had failed to inform the signalman. The guard of the failed train was criticised for not having properly protected the rear of that train.
On 6 August 1889, there was an accident between Bishopsgate and Liverpool Street when an up passenger service ran into the back of a stationary empty coaching stock train. The enquiry was unable to determine the exact cause of the accident due to conflicting witness statements.
On 17 October 1891, a passenger train was derailed at Lavenham, Suffolk. During recovery operations, a crane was derailed.

 On 24 December 1891, an accident occurred at Barnby Box (between Beccles and Carlton Colville) with three killed and four injuries.
 On 25 September 1900 at Westerfield 0845, GER Class Y14 0-6-0 locomotive No. 522 which was then just a year old stopped at a signal on the Ipswich side of the level crossing awaiting a route to the Felixstowe branch. Shortly afterwards the boiler exploded killing driver John Barnard and his fireman William Macdonald, both based at Ipswich engine shed. The boiler was thrown  forwards, over the level crossing and ended up on the down platform. Apparently the locomotive had a history of boiler problems although in the official report the Boiler Foreman at Ipswich Engine shed was blamed. The victims were buried in Ipswich cemetery and both their gravestones have a likeness of a Y14 0-6-0 carved onto them.
 On 5 April 1905, two trains collided on the junction directly north of Stratford Market station with the goods engine overturning and crushing its fireman William Secker. The driver of the other train had mistakenly started his train thinking the signal was in his favour.
Eleven people were killed and 71 were injured.
Three people were killed and fourteen were injured.
Ten people were killed and over 500 were injured.

Rolling stock and other material

Locomotives

Prior to 1862

Prior to 1862 the companies that had built the various parts of the network operated locomotives from a variety of engineering companies. It was not until 1850 that the Eastern Counties Railway under Gooch built a locomotive at the then newly opened Stratford Works. Number 20 was the first of a class of six  locomotives (although three more were also built by R B Longridge and Co of Bedlington, Northumberland). Slightly bigger improved versions of the class followed in 1853 and 1854.

In 1859 Sinclair (Chief mechanical engineer (CME) of the Eastern Counties Railway and later first CME of the Great Eastern) started some form of standardisation with the Y Class  locomotives, of which 110 were built by various engineering firms (including one French firm). The last locomotives of this class were withdrawn in 1894.

1862 to 1880
Sinclair's first design for the GER was the W class single drivers built between 1862 and 1867 by a number of engineering firms. Another member of this class carried a cream livery "encircled by garlands of roses" when it was used to haul a special train in 1863 for the Prince and Princess of Wales (Edward VII and Queen Alexandria) after their marriage at Westminster Abbey. These locomotives were responsible for running express services on the Great Eastern and in later life worked the Cathedrals Express to Lincoln and York.

Scrapping began in 1883 with the last two locomotives being withdrawn in 1894. The only other classes of locomotive that Sinclair designed were a  class of five engines built for the North Woolwich line and a class of  engines known as Scotchmen because they were built by Neilson,Reid & Co of Glasgow. Both classes entered service in 1864/65.

Generally Great Eastern locomotives carried a pea-green livery with black lining at this time.

When Johnson took over as CME, the GER was so short of locomotives that he persuaded the North British Railway to let the GER have five locomotives of a  class being built by the Neilson, Reid & Co for them on loan. These formed the basis of the 40 strong 'little Sharpie' (or Number 1) class, with 10 being built by Stratford Works and the other 30 by Sharp Stewart hence the nickname. The GER was working many trains on the London Tilbury and Southend Railway at this time and the Sharpies were deployed on this traffic. The last two were withdrawn in 1913.

The next Johnson class was an  goods engine (Class 417) introduced in 1867 and 1868 and numbering 60 engines. A number of these engines had hinged chimneys for use through Silvertown tunnel on the North Woolwich line which had limited headroom. Scrapping began in 1888 with the final locomotive withdrawn in 1899.

Another more powerful  design followed in 1872/3 and was known as the 477 class. Introduced in 1872 and 1873, this 50-strong class was built by 5 different companies, and was notable for being the first GER engines with a six-wheeled tender. All were withdrawn between 1898 and 1902.

The growth of London suburban traffic saw a requirement for additional tank engines.  The GER borrowed some Metropolitan Railway A Class  engines in the early 1870s and had 15 T7 class  engines built, followed by some  engines, one of which was the first locomotive to carry the distinctive GER Royal Blue livery.

The final locomotives introduced by Johnson were two C8 class  locomotives which were built with no engine brakes and no dedicated tenders. These locomotives, numbers 305 and 306, were frequently used on royal trains and finished their careers as station pilots at St Pancras and Liverpool Street.

The 0-4-4T 61 class was the first Adams engine, and these 50 engines were built for suburban traffic. Ten  locomotives (Class 61) followed between 1877 and 1879 and these lasted until 1907.  Adams next design was a  class known as Ironclads.  Unfortunately these were not very successful on passenger traffic and were soon deployed on freight workings.

The next Adams locomotive was the first UK  locomotive built in 1877. Another failure, this class of 15 locomotives were withdrawn after a working life of eight years, mostly working coal traffic between Peterborough and London.

Adams was succeeded by Massey Bromley who made the decision that henceforth more locomotives would be built at Stratford Works. Up to this point only 80 had been built.

However Bromley's first class of  locomotives were built by Dubs and Kitson with 12 allocated to Stratford and four each to Norwich and Yarmouth sheds. One of these locomotives was later equipped with oil-burning capabilities, but the increasing demands of railway traffic saw these engines withdrawn by 1893 after a relatively short life. Bromley also designed an  class which lasted some 24 years in traffic. He also designed the E10 class  some of which were fitted with condensing gear and operated over the East London Line to New Cross and East Croydon.

1880 to 1922

Between 1880 and 1922 the Great Eastern produced some distinctive locomotives, and several of these have been preserved. Almost all of the Great Eastern's locomotives were, after 1880, built at Stratford Works and many lasted until the end of steam on the Great Eastern.

Express services on the GER were latterly in the hands of the Class S69 (LNER class B12)  locomotives. Designed by James Holden and also known as the '1500 class', these engines were built at Stratford Works (51 engines) and William Beardmore (20 engines). Ten engines were later built for the London and North Eastern Railway by Beyer Peacock, and it is one of these locomotives that is preserved today.

These locomotives were built to succeed the three classes of  employed by the GER on express services which were becoming heavier as the railways prospered. Classes S46, D56 and H88 (LNER D14, D15, and D16) were collectively nicknamed "Claud Hamiltons" because the first S46 (built at Stratford in 1900, numbered 1900) was named after the then-current chairman of the GER, Lord Claud Hamilton. Most of the "Clauds" were later rebuilt by the LNER; the final one was withdrawn in 1960 and scrapped.

Local suburban traffic was dealt with by numerous 2-4-2T and 0-6-0T locomotives belonging to several different classes. Stratford Engine Shed, for instance, had 163 2-4-2T engines of four classes.  As trains got heavier, these locomotives were replaced by the Class L77 0-6-2T (LNER N7) designed by Alfred John Hill and introduced in 1915. 134 were built, including a number after the LNER took over in 1923; one is preserved. The 2-4-2Ts, of which none survive, were mostly cascaded out of suburban traffic by the 1940s and worked until the late 1950s on branch lines.

Mention should also be made of the T26 (LNER E4) s, which remained in service as the last locomotives of this wheel arrangement in Great Britain. Derived from the larger T19 , 100 of these locomotives were built between 1891 and 1902 and worked a variety of trains across East Anglia. The last one, GER no. 490, was preserved as part of the National Collection when withdrawn in 1959. Today it resides at Bressingham Steam Museum, Norfolk. Some of the T19s, incidentally, were rebuilt as s (class T19R) between 1905 and 1908, having been taken off express work by the "Claud Hamiltons". As LNER class D13, the last worked until 1944.

GER goods designs of this period were invariably  tender engines. The main freight class built by the GER was Worsdell's Y14 (LNER J15)  class.  289 examples were produced between 1883 and 1913 with most being built at Stratford Works, although a small number were built by Sharp Stewart. On 10–11 December 1891, the Great Eastern Railway's Stratford Works built one of these locomotives and had it in steam with a coat of grey primer in just 9 hours 47 minutes; this remains a world record. The locomotive then went off to run  on Peterborough to London coal trains before coming back to the works for the final coat of paint. It lasted 40 years and ran a total of 1,. As freight traffic grew heavier after 1900, more 0-6-0 freight locomotives were built including classes F48 (LNER J16), E72 (LNER J18), G58 (LNER J17) and D81 (LNER J20); the Y14s, meanwhile, went into general local and branch line service, on both passenger and freight trains. The last Y14s ran until 1962, and no. 564 is preserved on the North Norfolk Railway; and G58 no. 1217 (withdrawn 1962) is in the National Railway Museum, York.

Shunting was generally in the hands of  locomotives although of note were the Class J70 tram engines employed at Ipswich docks and on the Wisbech and Outwell tramway. This class of locomotive was later the inspiration of the Reverend Awdry's Toby the tram engine.

Finally mention must be made of the Decapod which was the first  built in Britain, and possibly the only locomotive built for purely political purposes in order to block the passage through Parliament of a new rival scheme for an electric railway.

Livery
In the early years, the Great Eastern locomotive livery changed often, first being held in various shades of green and later black. In 1882 the well-known Ultramarine Blue livery was introduced. It consisted of Ultramarine Blue over an undercoat of French Grey, with black smokebox and vermillion buffer beams and lining. From 1915 locos were not given a top coat and ran in French Grey undercoat but with the boiler bands picked out in black.

Locomotive stock (1923)

Numbers of each GER locomotive class and running numbers (first and last numbers only) in 1922, prior to the 1923 Grouping. Note that the numbering is not necessarily contiguous:

Preserved locomotives

The following GE locomotives are preserved:

 there are plans to build two replica steam locomotives - a class D15  (known as the Claud Hamilton class) and an F5 .

Coaching stock
Whilst not being at the forefront of carriage development, there were a number of interesting developments on the GER worth noting.

Main line

Even by 1900 bogie coaches were rare on GER, with trains of six-wheelers being the norm. They contained two first-class compartments with lavatories sandwiched between four third-class compartments and a luggage compartment. The GER supplied separate luggage compartments for most of its main line stock. In 1900 an updated version had a corridor and third-class access to the lavatories but no corridor connections to other carriages.

In 1904 Stratford produced a complete corridor train (this means a person can walk from the first to the last carriage whilst the train is moving). Despite the trend to bogied stock, Stratford still included three 6-wheeler carriages and a 4-wheeled luggage van in this formation. The other vehicles were all bogied stock and included a kitchen car. This train was also fitted for steam heating throughout and was employed on Liverpool Street - Parkeston Quay services.

In 1906 a new train set was produced for the North Country Continental train (see below) and in 1907 for the Norfolk Coast Express (see below). The latter was notable for being the first all corridor set built by Stratford Works. However, with the restaurant sets built in 1900 being corridor coaches, more corridor coaches were being added to main line sets.

The livery of the stock was teak (effectively varnished wood) but in 1919 the decision was taken to paint all stock dark red. At the grouping in 1923 however all stock reverted to the teak livery.

Pullman
The introduction of Pullman cars to the GER was the idea of American General Manager Henry Worth Thornton. These were tried across the network and required payment of a supplementary fare. Unfortunately it was not a success although they were used on Liverpool Street - Harwich Continental trains for many years.

Dining and restaurant
In 1891 the Great Eastern introduced the first restaurant car to its North Country Continental service.

In 1899 Stratford Works produced four restaurant car sets consisting of three cars vestibuled together but without any corridor connections. This meant passengers had to spend the whole journey in the restaurant car. These were employed on services from Cromer and Yarmouth to Liverpool Street.

Suburban

In 1900 the majority of GER suburban trains were composed of four-wheeler carriages.

Interior design was spartan and around 1900 third-class passengers sat on bare boards five abreast, second-class passengers on cushions also five abreast, while first-class passengers sat four abreast and enjoyed more legroom. This set, which also included such modern features as slam lock doors and gas tail lamps became the model for future suburban carriage design.

In 1899 Holden built the first GER all-bogied suburban train and although a success, the next one did not follow until 1911.

The GER made every effort to maximise the capacity of its suburban carriages to deal with the rise in usage. In the early 1900s some four-wheeler carriages were cut in half longitudinally and a section inserted to make them wider in order to increase the capacity.
More bogied suburban trains followed in 1911 and were deployed on the Ilford, Gidea Park and Loughton services. By 1915 A. J. Hill instigated a policy of converting old four-wheel carriages into bogied stock and some 500 four-wheeled carriages were converted this way. The GER had a reputation for doing things on the cheap and this certainly was cheaper than building new stock.

Ships
The GER also operated a number of ferries.

Cranes
The GER had a total of 11 breakdown cranes. Numbers 1a, 2a and 3a were built at Stratford Works in 1885 initially as hand cranes. They were converted to steam cranes at Stratford c 1905/06 and lasted into LNER days.

Three examples built by Cowans, Sheldon & Company were purchased between 1892 and 1899. With lifting capacity of  they were employed on permanent way work.

Three more cranes (numbers 4a, 5a and unnumbered) were also built at Stratford c1907. The unnumbered example was lost at sea during the First World War whilst in War Department use.

The last two cranes (number 6a and SB4) were built by Ransomes & Rapier of Ipswich in 1913 and 1919. With a lifting capacity of  both were employed on railway work until the 1960s. During LNER days SB4 was frequently used at publicity events to give people an aerial ride in an old wagon body.  While 6a was transferred away from the GER shortly after 1923, SB4 was allocated to Stratford, Norwich and March before moving north to the Sheffield area.

Buses and horses
The May 1911 issue of the Great Eastern Railway Magazine (the in-house magazine of the GER) stated the company had 1,750 horses the majority of which worked in the London area. Some wagon shunting work was carried out by horses but they would have found widespread work hauling delivery carts.

The Great Eastern built buses at Stratford and ran a number of omnibus services including Halesworth to Southwold.

Hotels and other business interests
The GER owned five hotels at the end of their existence in 1922.

The Great Eastern Hotel
The Great Eastern Hotel was located at Liverpool Street Railway station opened in May 1884 and enlarged in 1901. This was the biggest hotel on the system.
The large function room known as the Hamilton Hall was restored in the 1990s and re-opened as a pub. The hotel is still open today.

The Felix Hotel
The Felix Hotel located in Felixstowe was purchased by the GER in the 1920s. Built by the local Tollemache family (of brewing fame) in 1902, the hotel was lavishly equipped with tennis courts, winter gardens, a putting course, croquet lawns and a squash court. Hugely popular when Felixstowe was a resort by the 1930s it was in decline and sold to Fisons in 1952. Visitors included Kaiser Wilhelm in 1891 and in later post GER days, Wallis Simpson and Fred Perry. In the 1980s the building - then named Harvest House – was converted to apartments.

The Harwich Hotel
This was opened in 1865 and, although well-equipped and furnished, struggled to make a profit (especially after Parkeston Quay opened). The GER tried to sell it in early 1907 but it failed to meet its reserve price so closed in July 1907.

The GER refurbished the hotel and re-opened it in 1912 but when the First World War started in 1914 it became a naval hospital. After the war the GER opened the hotel again, but it closed in 1923. It was later used as council offices.

The Parkeston Quay Hotel
This hotel was opened in 1883 when the continental steamer services were transferred from Harwich. It had 26 rooms. It was part of the station buildings – later used as shipping agent's offices.

Sandringham Hotel
The Sandringham Hotel at Hunstanton was opened on 1 May 1876 and built by the Lynn and Hunstanton Railway. It was not acquired by the GER until 1 July 1890 when an act of parliament incorporated the Hunstanton and West Norfolk Railway. The GER expanded the premises in the early 1900s with rooms numbering over 100. The hotel prospered until the Second World War where it first housed the LNER Accounts department and was then requisitioned by the War department and used by various British and Canadian regiments during the rest of the war.

It was bought by Hunstanton Urban District Council in 1950 and used as offices and a library until 1959 when the property was converted into flats. The building was demolished in 1967.

Laundry
The GER built a laundry in 1888 in Colchester that supplied the hotels with bed linen, tablecloths etc. At one point it employed 70 people.

Farming
During 1916 the GER ran a poultry demonstration trains throughout East Anglia often visiting towns on market day. The purpose of this train was to encourage self-sufficiency during the food shortages of the First World War. Encouraged by the reception this train got, the GER purchased Dodnash Priory Farm in Bentley, Suffolk as a poultry demonstration farm. The hen houses were built at Stratford Works and had individual works numbers. By 1920 the farm was producing 40,000 eggs per month for the GER as well as chickens, turkeys, fruit and vegetables for the GER hotels, restaurants, dining cars and buffets. Another establishment at Chigwell has been doing this for some years previously.

Dodnash Priory also served as a rest home for GER horses. A siding about three-quarters of a mile south of Bentley railway station on the down side served the farm.

The farm survived into LNER days being sold in 1927 when the farmer reached 70 and retired. The siding had been removed in May 1925.

Stratford Market 
Stratford Market was founded by the GER in 1879 as a wholesale fruit and vegetable market as a competitor to the City of London's Spitalfields Market. The market also had an extensive goods depot and a nearby railway station.

People

Chief mechanical engineers
The chief mechanical engineers of the Great Eastern Railway were:

 1862–1866 Robert Sinclair
 1866–1873 Samuel W. Johnson
 1873–1878 William Adams
 1878–1881 Massey Bromley
 1881–1885 Thomas William Worsdell
 1885–1907 James Holden
 1908–1912 S. D. Holden
 1912–1922 Alfred John Hill

Chairmen
The chairmen of the Great Eastern Railway were:

 Horatio Love 1862–1863 - a stockbroker and former chairman of the Eastern Counties Railway.
 James Goodson 1863-1866 - a solicitor
 Charles Turner 1866-1868 (continued as vice chairman after 1868)
 Viscount Cranborne 1868–1871
 Lightly Simpson 1872–1874
 Charles Henry Parkes 1874–1893
 Lord Claud Hamilton 1893–1922

Viscount Cranborne went on to be the British prime minister between 1885 and 1892 and between 1895 and 1903. Parkeston Quay is named after C. H. Parkes and the famous Great Eastern 4-4-0 class was named after Claud Hamilton.

Some details of other directors can be found .

Notes

References

Sources

Further reading

External links 

 Great Eastern Railway Society
 Archived copy of a page containing comprehensive details of those railways
 Shipping interests of the company
 Manningtree Rail Users Association 

 
Pre-grouping British railway companies
London and North Eastern Railway constituents
Transport in Epping Forest District
5 ft gauge railways in the United Kingdom
Railway companies established in 1862
Railway companies disestablished in 1884
1862 establishments in England
1884 disestablishments in England
British companies disestablished in 1884
British companies established in 1862